The Spanish legend of la Encantada is a generic name that refers to a set of oral traditions and legends mythological narrated in numerous Spanish localities . Although there are multiple local variants, a series of elements are common: the protagonist (a young woman with long hair), the time (St. John's Eve), the manifestation (combing her hair) and other elements (mirror, wedding, comb—generally gold).

La Encantada is closely related (supposedly) to mythological beings such as the Lamias, Mouras (Galician mythology), Mari and Mairu (Basque mythology), the Anjanas (Cantabrian mythology) and the Xanas (Asturian mythology), In fact one and the other, in essence, are different versions of the same narrative but adapted to particular cultural environments. Likewise, its relationship with the mexican figure Xtabay suggests a very ancient and almost universal presence of the myth or a possible transatlantic diffusion, either through the processes of conquest of America, in the reverse process through the importation of legends of the original American peoples, or being a round-trip tradition.

Toponymy 

The term encantada ("enchanted") is quite common in Spanish toponymy and microtoponymy and, normally, designates the apparition. Gálmez de Fuentes considers said toponym as an explanation or a posteriori adaptation of the Pre-Roman term *kanto ("stone, stony shore"). Another parallelism is that, in such places, there are usually archaeological sites, so it is considered a fairly reliable indicator in previous prospecting.

Many times the toponym is presented under the form mora encantada ("enchanted mora"), which may lead to believe that the sites are from the period of the Muslim domination. This is not true, since many of them are earlier and show a survival of cultural substrates that reflect the antiquity and historical memory of the place. The explanation to these supposed moras (which is an adaptation to Spanish of the Galician mouras, which designates the Encantadas of Galicia and Portugal) can be related to the pre-Roman term *mor ("mound, heap of stones") and, in turn, to the morras, typical villages of the Bronze Age of La Mancha. The name of the Basque goddess Mari is not far from these moras and mouras either, etymologically.

Versions 

In essence, the legend narrates the apparition of a beautiful young woman combing her long hair with a golden comb, around Saint John's Eve and in the vicinity of a castle, cave or other natural site charged with strong symbolism. The encounter with it can arouse an enchantment of the spectator, who is generally a shepherd or farmer. Some of the different versions of the myth are:

Aketegi (Cegama)

Baza

Benamor (Moratalla)

Coy 
On the St. John's Eve a Moorish princess dressed in white and with long hair comes out of la Encantá Cave to comb her hair and wash her face in the spring of the Fountain. In the past, people did not go out on the street that night for fear of being enchanted. The cave is located in the Cabezo de la Encantá, where there are remains of an ancient watchtower from medieval times that, together with the castle of Coy, was part of the defensive constructions of Campo Coy.

Las Camarillas (Hellín)

Manzanares el Real. La Pedriza 
The Cueva de la Mora in la Pedriza, Manzanares el Real (Madrid), is reminiscent of stories that are repeated throughout the Spanish geography due perhaps to the long Muslim occupation. There is another legend with this title, collected by Gustavo Adolfo Bécquer in his Legends, located in the Navarre town of Fitero.

The cave, which is difficult to access, is located near the Giner de los Ríos shelter, specifically in front of its main façade and to the east of the Peña Sirio. It seems that the daughter of a rich Arab fell in love with a young Christian. In this situation she was kidnapped and held by her Muslim relatives inside this cave. Years passed and the Christian knight never returned, despite the longed-for wait by the young woman, so according to the beliefs of the people, from time to time, the soul of the scorned young woman slips wandering among the rock formations and canchales trying to find her lost love.

Paterna del Madera

Puerto Lumbreras

Rojales 
La Encantá is a traditional legend from Rojales, a village in the Vega Baja del Segura in the province of Alicante. The story goes that many centuries ago, in the Middle Ages, an Arab princess named Zulaida or Zoraida falls in love with a Christian prince, provoking the wrath of her father, the Moorish king, who curses her to live forever enchanted inside the round mountain called Cabezo Soler, next to the Segura river, on the road that goes from the village of Rojales to Guardamar. Every year, and only on Saint John's Eve, la Encantá appears in the Cabezo Soler for someone to free her. If a brave man meets her, la Encantá will ask him to carry her in his arms to the Segura River to bathe her feet and thus break the curse. But for the man who carries her, la Encantá becomes heavier and heavier, not to mention the monsters that come out to meet her, causing the poor brave man to fall faint to the ground, letting go of the princess, condemning her to return to her confinement in the mountain, and in turn burdening him with a curse formulated by her for not achieving his goal: that of dying with his tongue out.

This legend has been remembered thanks to the oral tradition and the novelization of the writer Fausto Cartagena. There is also a play written by Salvador García Aguilar, which was directed with great success by the famous director Alberto González Vergel, and a medium-length film entitled La leyenda de la Encantá, directed by Francisco Jorge Mora García and Joaquín Manuel Murcia Meseguer in 2002, which won the Special Mention in its category at the International Film Festival Cinema Jove in Valencia. Years later, the composer Francisco Jorge Mora García composed several instrumental and choir pieces inspired by the legend of la Encantá ("Noche de San Juan", "Tema de Zulaida", "Batalla en el Cabezo Soler",...).

Usanos 
La Encantada de Usanos is a traditional legend of Usanos, province of Guadalajara. The legend has passed from generation to generation and speaks of a lamia or bewitched and beautiful woman that in the hill of the Castillejo, as it goes from Usanos to the term of Galapagos, has its lair in a cave, from which flows a stream.

On St. John's day each year, the lamia is visible, and she combs her long golden hair with a comb in one hand and a dagger in the other, trying to switch places with any passerby who approaches her on that date. For the spell to occur, it is enough for the passerby to hold the lamia's gaze or engage in conversation with her, at which point the switch of the bewitched person would occur.

This legend has been remembered thanks to the oral tradition and to having been poetized and collected in the book Castilla, este canto es tu canto (Parte II) by the writer Juan Pablo Mañueco, in 2014.

Villarrobledo 

In this version, the fundamental elements are present: the beautiful young girl, the curse (or enchantment), the golden comb or St. John's Eve. However, what is peculiar is that it links the legend with reality since, indeed, in the area there is a "castle" and others nearby and "rare flowers that cannot be found elsewhere" grow.

Meanings

General 

The "story" of the enchanted woman in itself has its roots in a time when the knowledge and the very history of human societies were transmitted in an oral tradition way and reflects manifestations of the past that are difficult to explain nowadays. La Encantada is reminiscent of the nymphs of classical mythology (young female figures of great beauty who appear by the water.) In many of them, one can also intuit the precedents of fairy tales (young girls of great physical and spiritual beauty are enchanted by some evil power and are left waiting for some brave hero to break their spell with a wonderful deed). The similarities between the stories suggest cultural contact, perhaps from prehistory.

In general, the encounters with Mari, the mouras, and the encantadas are not positive for the viewer; although there is a certain graduation between the terrible character of Mari and the possibility of being bewitched or bewitched by the encantadas. Many of the latter give the possibility of salvation for people who encounter them by choosing one, among several objects; although it is remarkable the character of some of them, like the one of Villarrobledo, whose only look (in clear allusion to the Lamias and the Santa Compaña) can serve her to free herself and leave the unhappy spectator occupying her place.

Symbols

Cave 
Associated with the earth and the underground world, the symbolic meaning of caves has traditionally been related to the mysteries of birth and death. As an entrance to hell or to the world of the dead, they have been used since the Paleolithic as burial sites. But the grottos are also representations of the generating womb of the Mother Earth, which made them the birthplaces of the gods, heros, spirits and other mythological beings. In turn, this confluence of life and death made them ideal locations for the performance of initiatory death rites. Their cross-cultural and intertemporal symbolic importance is remarkable, as Jesus Christ himself is buried in a cave and Orpheus searches for his beloved Eurydice by walking through a cave (Hades).

Mirror 

It is related to the moon, another feminine symbol, and appears in numerous folklore legends and tales of magical and mythological character. It arouses apparition either of the past or visions of the future. Generically the mirror is considered as a door of the soul through which, by dissociation, one can enter another dimension. Mirrors appear and have a great prominence in the work of Lewis Carroll, Through the Looking Glass and What Alice Found There, although they do not appear in all versions of la Encantada legends.

Saint John's Eve 
Spanish magical date par excellence because it is said that the Spanish fairies usually have special predilection for this day. There are a great number of legends, romances, traditions and myths related to June 24, before the arrival of the summer solstice in the northern hemisphere (winter solstice in the southern hemisphere). It is considered the great night of love, oracles, divination and fertility. Coinciding approximately with the feast of Saint John, since Pre-Roman times, various celebrations have been held in Spain in which fire, in the form of bonfires or luminarias, plays an important role. It has been interpreted that this action was intended to "give more strength to the sun" which, from those days, was becoming "weaker" (the days are getting shorter until the winter solstice). The fact of being ascribed under the invocation of the Baptist is the sign of the ultimate Christianization of a pagan rite that seems to have resisted successive influences of the Roman religion, paleo-Christianity, Muslim and, again, Christianity.

Comb 

Anthropologically, the symbol of the comb is related to that of the boat (from paddles). The linear kinship between the two is very great and they represent the mutual penetration of the elements water and fire. The comb is an attribute of fabulous beings of feminine nature, such as lamias and mermaids, the relation of the comb with the fleshy tail of the fish and the consequent mortuary meaning fits.

Geographical location 
Being transmitted from generation to generation and being located in places very well known and dear to the locals, it is often thought that the legend is exclusive to each locality where it occurs; however, there are many villages of Spain (especially in the southeast) where, with greater or lesser wealth of details and variants, there were alleged enchanted maidens. This is a non-exhaustive list of places in Spanish geography where the legend has been collected.

Location map 

This map shows how the presence of the legend is concentrated, fundamentally, in localities of three specific areas of the peninsula: Galicia, La Mancha-Southeast (Murcia and provinces of Albacete and Cuenca mainly) and Basque Country. Although there are no studies linking the legend to a specific culture or set of beliefs, it is quite remarkable the fact that they coincide, roughly speaking, with places of very ancient cultural tradition: Argaric area, Motillas, Castreña culture, and Basque peoples.

Likewise, quite a few of these "enchantments" are found in neighboring or very close localities (Hellín-Isso, Barchín del Hoyo-El Picazo-Villarrobledo-Munera, Illana-Santa Cruz de la Zarza-Torrejoncillo del Rey-Carrascosa del Campo-Uclés, Baza-Granada, Aramayona-Cegama, etc.) forming in the southeast a very clear ideal axis between the east of Madrid and Cartagena.

See also 

 Spanish mythology
 Basque mythology
 Lamia

References

Bibliography 

 

 

 

 

Spanish culture
Spanish mythology
Spanish folklore
Castilla–La Mancha
Villarrobledo
Spanish legendary creatures